Mark Lamster (born in New York City) is an American architecture writer and critic. He writes in the Dallas Morning News.

In 2018 he wrote an biography, The Man in the Glass House: Philip Johnson, Architect of the Modern Century, showing the Nazi past of Philip Johnson.

References

External links
 

Living people
American architecture critics
Year of birth missing (living people)